Eucalyptus angophoroides, commonly known as the apple-topped box, apple box or apple gum, is a tree endemic to south-eastern Australia. It has rough, flaky or fibrous bark on its trunk and larger branches, lance-shaped adult leaves, white flowers and conical to hemispherical fruit.

Description
The thinner branches sometimes have similar rough bark or smooth white or grey bark that is shed in short ribbons. The leaves on young plants are arranged in opposite pairs, broadly egg-shaped to heart-shaped or almost round, dull, dark green with a lighter shade on the lower side and lack a stalk. The two sides of the leaf are a different shade of green.

Taxonomy and naming
Eucalyptus angophoroides was first formally described in 1901 by Richard Thomas Baker who published the description in Proceedings of the Linnean Society of New South Wales. The tree has the appearance of an "apple tree" (Angophora) and had previously been known as "apple-top box" and was accordingly given the specific epithet angophoroides.

Distribution and habitat
Apple-top box grows in valleys and on hillsides, often near the edge of swamps, and in open forest and wet forest, usually in fertile soils. It is found in New South Wales south from Towrang to the northern foothills of the Strzelecki Ranges south of Trafalgar, Victoria.

Gallery

References

 

angophoroides
Myrtales of Australia
Flora of New South Wales
Flora of Victoria (Australia)
Trees of Australia
Plants described in 1901
Taxa named by Richard Thomas Baker